John Harold MacLean (born November 20, 1964) is a Canadian ice hockey assistant coach for the New York Islanders and former player. He spent the majority of his playing career as a member of the New Jersey Devils, and also spent time with the San Jose Sharks, New York Rangers and Dallas Stars.

Playing career
As a youth, MacLean played in the 1977 Quebec International Pee-Wee Hockey Tournament with a minor ice hockey team from Oshawa.

MacLean was selected 6th overall in the 1983 NHL Entry Draft. He was selected as the 1st choice of the New Jersey Devils. MacLean made his Devils debut on October 5, 1983 against the New York Rangers. Perhaps his most memorable moment as a Devil came on April 3, 1988, when he scored a goal in overtime against the Chicago Blackhawks to send the Devils to the playoffs for the first time. Following this breakthrough year, MacLean notched three straight 40-goal seasons before he was forced to miss the 1991–92 season due to a serious knee injury sustained during a preseason game. During his tenure with the Devils, MacLean won the Stanley Cup in 1995 while serving as the team's alternate captain. He remained with the Devils until December 7, 1997 when he was traded to the San Jose Sharks. After finishing the 1997–98 season with the Sharks, MacLean signed as a free agent with the New York Rangers in July 1998. The Rangers traded MacLean to the Dallas Stars in February 2001. On June 7, 2002 John MacLean retired from hockey after 18 seasons. He played a total 1,194 games, scoring 413 goals, adding 429 assists for 842 career points, and was the all-time leading scorer for the New Jersey Devils until March 17, 2009, when his record was surpassed by Patrik Eliáš.

MacLean has been a resident of Verona, New Jersey since 1991.

Coaching career
In September 2002, MacLean joined the coaching staff of the New Jersey Devils, and served as an assistant coach until July 2009. He earned his second Stanley Cup, as an assistant coach, in 2003. In 2007, John was a candidate for the head coach position but the job was given to Brent Sutter and MacLean remained as assistant coach.

On June 9, 2009, Brent Sutter resigned as head coach of the Devils and remarked that MacLean was ready to be head coach. On July 13, 2009, John MacLean was named head coach of the Lowell Devils.

On June 17, 2010, MacLean was named head coach of the New Jersey Devils.

On December 23, 2010, the Devils were sporting a 9–22–2 record and sitting in last place in the Eastern Conference. MacLean was fired from his coaching position and was replaced by Jacques Lemaire. 

On December 1, 2011, the Carolina Hurricanes, after hiring Kirk Muller as their new head coach, hired MacLean as an assistant coach. MacLean, along with fellow assistant coach Dave Lewis, was relieved of his duties on May 5, 2014.

On July 27, 2017, MacLean joined the Arizona Coyotes as an assistant coach.

On September 8, 2021, the San Jose Sharks hired MacLean as an assistant coach. He was relieved of his duties on July 1, 2022.

Post-playing career
In addition to working as an analyst on NHL Network, MacLean most recently served as a hockey analyst for MSG Networks, including the pre- and post-game coverage for the Devils.

Awards
 Stanley Cup (1995) New Jersey Devils - As Player
 Stanley Cup (2003) New Jersey Devils - As Assistant Coach
 Memorial Cup tournament All-Star Team (1983)
 Selected to two NHL All-Star Games, 1989 and 1991
 New Jersey Devils MVP, 1989–90

Career statistics

Regular season and playoffs

International

Coaching record

NHL coaching record

AHL statistics

Records
New Jersey Devils franchise record for power play points (197)
New Jersey season goals leader: 1988–89 (42), 1989–90 (41), 1990–91 (45), 1993–94 (37), 1996–97 (29, tie)
New Jersey playoffs points leader: 1991 (8, tie), 1997 (9)
New Jersey playoffs goals leader: 1990 (4), 1991 (5), 1997 (4, tie)
New Jersey playoffs assists leader: 1997 (5)
San Jose Sharks playoffs points leader: 1998 (5, tie)
San Jose Sharks playoffs goals leader: 1998 (2, tie)

See also
List of NHL players with 1000 games played

References

External links

John MacLean's profile at hockeydraftcentral.com

1964 births
Living people
Albany Devils coaches
Canadian ice hockey forwards
Carolina Hurricanes coaches
Dallas Stars players
Ice hockey people from Ontario
Lowell Devils coaches
Arizona Coyotes coaches
National Hockey League All-Stars
National Hockey League first-round draft picks
New Jersey Devils coaches
New Jersey Devils draft picks
New Jersey Devils players
New York Rangers players
New York Islanders coaches
Oshawa Generals players
People from Verona, New Jersey
San Jose Sharks players
Sportspeople from Oshawa
Stanley Cup champions
Canadian ice hockey coaches